Katasha R. Artis (born July 9, 1973) is an American basketball player who played in the WNBA. She is a member of the Northeastern University athletics Hall of Fame. Artis was inducted in 2001 for her accomplishments in the sport of basketball. Artis is currently the head coach at Kingsborough Community College.

College career
Artis began her collegiate career at the University of Virginia after being an All-American has a high school star in Brooklyn. During her first season at Virginia, Artis suffered a knee injury and transferred to Northeastern.

After sitting out the required on year due to NCAA transfer rules, Artis began to play for the Huskies as a sophomore. She averaged 14.4 points and 9.3 rebounds a game during her first season.

Her junior year saw Artis take her game to the next level. Artis lead Northeastern to the Eastern U.S. playoffs and was voted American East Player of the Year and was voted to the All-East and District I All-American teams. She averaged 20.6 points per hame.

During her senior season Artis averaged 21.2 points per game, leading the Huskies to a 19-10 season. Artis was voted American East Player of the Year for the second straight season, along with All-East and District I All-American.

Professional career
Artis played the 1997 season with the WNBA Charlotte Sting. She also played professionally in Turkey for a number of years.

Coaching
Before the 2007-08 season, Artis was named the head women's basketball coach at Kingsborough Community College.

References

External links
 GoNU.com Hall of Fame Profile

1973 births
Living people
American expatriate basketball people in Turkey
American women's basketball coaches
American women's basketball players
Basketball players from New York City
Charlotte Sting players
Junior college women's basketball coaches in the United States
Northeastern Huskies women's basketball players
Sportspeople from Brooklyn
Virginia Cavaliers women's basketball players
Undrafted Women's National Basketball Association players